Balmohan Vidyamandir was founded on June 03, 1940 by Late Shri. S.D.Rege alias “Dada” as he was fondly known amongst his students, parents and the community, was a teacher par excellence. The School was named “Balmohan Vidyamandir”. “Balmohan” being coined from the names of Lokmanya Balgangadhar Tilak and Mahatma Gandhi and “Vidyamandir” meaning a temple of learning. Today, the name “Balmohan Vidyamandir” is synonymous with being the leading cultural and educational hub of the State of Maharashtra, India.

Notable alumni

Notable alumni include:
 Lt. Dilip Hemchandra Gupte, Indian Army, Date of Martyrdom : Oct 11, 1965, India-Pakistan War
 Lt. Prakash Narayan Kotnis, Indian Army, Date of Martyrdom : Sept 15, 1965, India-Pakistan War
 Uddhav Thackeray, Chief Minister, Maharashtra, Shiv Sena Chief
 Jayant Patil, Cabinet Minister, Government of Maharashtra
 Raj Thackeray, Politician, Maharashtra Navnirman Sena Chief
 Poonam Mahajan, Politician, Member of Lok Sabha 
 Hemant Gokhale, Former Judge, Supreme Court of India
 Ranjana Desai, Former Judge, Supreme Court of India
 Dilip Babasaheb Bhosale, Judicial Member of Lokpal Committee, Former Chief Justice, High Court, Allahabad
 Neela Satyanarayanan, Retd. IAS, First Woman State Election Commissioner (SEC) of Maharashtra
 Smita Dolas Somane, IRS, Commissioner Customs GST
 Veeren Kamat, Group Captain, Indian Air Force
 Captain Paresh Kowli, Indian Navy
 Aniruddha B. Pandit, Vice Chancellor, Institute of Chemical Technology, Mumbai
 Asha Bhosle, Singer - Padma Vibhushan in 2008
 Hridaynath Mangeshkar, Singer and Music Director - Padma Shri in 2009
 Usha Mangeshkar, Singer - Maharashtra Ratna Award in 2011
 Meena Khadikar, Singer
 Shridhar Phadke, Singer and Music Director
 Padmaja Phenany Joglekar, Singer - Padma Shri in 2001
 Manohar Hardikar, Indian Test Cricketer
 Sandeep Patil, Indian Test Cricketer
 Raju Kulkarni Indian Test Cricketer
 Pravin Thipsay, International Chess Grandmaster - Arjuna Award in 1984
 Jay Kowli, Secretary-General, Boxing Federation of India - ‘Pillar of Hindustani Society' Award in 2007 
 Nitin Kannamwar, International Tennis Referee, the first Indian Line Umpire for Men's and Ladies Wimbledon finals.
 Sonali Vishnu Shingate, International Kabaddi player
  Dinesh Thakur, Mathematician
 Shashi Prabhu, Architect
 Sandeep Shikre, Architect
 Sucheta Bhide Chapekar, Bharatnatyam Guru & Choreographer
 Phulwa Khamkar, Choreographer
 Om Raut, Director - Maharashtra State Award 2015
 Nanda (actress), Actor
 Amol Palekar, Director, Actor - National Award
 Vijay Kenkre, Actor - Recipient of the Sangeet Natak Akademi Award in 1974 and the Jeevan Gaurav Puraskar in 2008
 Ajit Bhure, Actor, Producer, Director
 Arun Khopkar, Film-maker, Writer - National Award for the best book on cinema "Guru Dutt"
 Smita Talwalkar, Producer, Actor - National Award in 1989 and 1998
 Anant Jog, Actor
 Atul Parchure, Actor - 6 times Gold Medalist of Maharashtra State Best Actor Award in Professional Play category
 Sukanya Kulkarni Mone Theatre, Television, and Film Actor
 Priya Bapat, Actor - Maharashtra State Award 2014 for Best Acting
 Spruha Joshi, Actor, Anchor, Poet
 Pooja Sawant, Actor
 Suchitra Bandekar, Actor

External links

Schools in Mumbai
Educational institutions established in 1940
1940 establishments in India